The 2022–23 SHL season is the 48th season of the Swedish Hockey League (SHL). The regular season began on 17 September 2022 and is scheduled to end on 9 March 2023, where it will be then followed by the playoffs and the relegation playoffs.

Teams

The league consists of 14 teams; HV71 returned to the SHL after one season in the HockeyAllsvenskan, where they won the 2021–22 title. Djurgårdens IF were relegated to the HockeyAllsvenskan, and as a result, Stockholm was not represented by a top-division team for the first time.

Regular season
Each team played 52 games, playing each of the other thirteen teams four times: twice on home ice, and twice away from home. Points were awarded for each game, where three points were awarded for winning in regulation time, two points for winning in overtime or shootout, one point for losing in overtime or shootout, and zero points for losing in regulation time. At the end of the regular season, the team that finished with the most points was crowned the league champion.

Standings

Statistics

Scoring leaders

The following shows the top ten players who led the league in points, at the conclusion of the regular season. If two or more skaters are tied (i.e. same number of points, goals and played games), all of the tied skaters are shown.

Leading goaltenders
The following shows the top ten goaltenders who led the league in goals against average, provided that they had played at least 40% of their team's minutes, at the conclusion of the regular season.

Playoffs
Ten teams qualify for the playoffs: the top six teams in the regular season have a bye to the quarterfinals, while teams ranked seventh to tenth meet each other (7 versus 10, 8 versus 9) in a preliminary playoff round.

Format
In the first round, the 7th-ranked team meets the 10th-ranked team and the 8th-ranked team meets the 9th-ranked team for a place in the second round. In the second round, the top-ranked team will meet the lowest-ranked winner of the first round, the second-ranked team will face the other winner of the first round, the third-ranked team will face the sixth-ranked team, and the fourth-ranked team will face the fifth-ranked team. In the third round, the highest remaining seed is matched against the lowest remaining seed. In each round the higher-seeded team is awarded home advantage. The meetings are in the first round played as best-of-three series, and in the later rounds as best-of-seven series. In the eighth-finals, the higher-seeded teams play at home for game 2 (plus 3 if necessary) while the lower-seeded teams play at home for game 1. In the later rounds, the higher-seeded teams are at home for games 1 and 3 (plus 5 and 7 if necessary) while the lower-seeded teams are at home for games 2 and 4 (plus 6 if necessary).

Playoff bracket

Eighth-finals

(7) IK Oskarshamn vs. (10) Luleå HF

(8) Leksands IF vs. (9) Rögle BK

Quarter-finals

(1) Växjö Lakers vs. (10) Luleå HF

(2) Skellefteå AIK vs. (9) Rögle BK

(3) Färjestad BK vs. (6) Frölunda HC

(4) Örebro HK vs. (5) Timrå IK

Statistics

Scoring leaders
The following players led the league in points, at the conclusion of games played on 20 March 2023. If two or more skaters are tied (i.e. same number of points, goals and played games), all of the tied skaters are shown.

Leading goaltenders
The following shows the top five goaltenders who led the league in goals against average, provided that they have played at least 40% of their team's minutes, at the conclusion of games played on 20 March 2023.

Play Out
Teams 13 and 14 from the regular season plays a best-of-seven series, with the winner remaining in the SHL and the loser relegated to the second tier, HockeyAllsvenskan. The higher-seeded team holds home advantage over the series, playing at home for the odd-numbered games while the lower-seeded team is at home for the even-numbered games.

SHL awards

References

External links

SHL on eurohockey.com
SHL on eliteprospects.com

2022-23
SHL
SHL